Cautionary Tales is the third studio album from Australian singer songwriter Harmony James.

Track listing 

 Produced and engineered by Herm Kovac

Personnel 
 Steve Fearnley: drums
 Jeff McCormack: bass
 Glenn Hannah:electric guitars, mando guitar, acoustic guitar
 Stuart French:acoustic guitars, electric guitars
 Mark Sholtez: acoustic guitar
 Michel Rose: pedal steel
 Tim Crouch: fiddle, mandolin, cello
 Bill Risby: grand piano, Wurlitzer piano
 Brian Lizotte: trombone
 Angus Gomm: trumpet
 James McCrow: French horn
 Randy Kohrs: dobro
 Clayton Doley: Hammond organ
 Mike Carr: backing vocals
 Drew McAlister: backing vocals
 Travis Collins: backing vocals
 Brooke McClymont: backing vocals
 Hank Kovac: percussion, harmonica

References 

 Country Update
 Sydney Morning Herald

Harmony James albums
Warner Music Australasia albums
2014 albums